Kotamobagu is a city in North Sulawesi, Indonesia. It is the principal centre of the southern part of the province, the Bolaang Mongonow region, which is projected by the Indonesian government to be separated from the rest of North Sulawesi and formed into a separate province. The city covers an area of 108.89 km2, and had a population of 107,459 at the 2010 Census, rising to 123,722 at the 2020 Census.

Administrative districts 
The city is divided into four districts (kecamatan) tabulated below with their areas and their  population as at the 2010 Census and the 2020 Census. The table also includes the location of the district centres, the number of administrative villages (urban kelurahan) in each district, and its postal codes.

Autonomy
As an autonomous city, in 2011 Kotamobagu was judged the best autonomous area from among 57 autonomous areas which have been formed by central government since 2007.

Climate
Kotamobagu has a tropical rainforest climate (Af) with moderate rainfall in August and September and heavy rainfall in the remaining months.

References

External links
  Kotamobagu government website
 Kotamobagu Map — Satellite Images of Kotamobagu